Remember You're a Womble was the second album released by The Wombles. The songs were recorded by Mike Batt (vocals/keyboards) with session musicians Chris Spedding (guitars), Les Hurdle (bass), Clem Cattini (drums), Ray Cooper (percussion), Rex Morris (saxophone), Eddie Mordue (saxophone) and Jack Rothstein (violin).

After the success of the first album, Wombling Songs, Batt experimented with more character-based songs in a variety of musical styles. He described it as "really the first proper album for The Wombles as a group". The styles included pop, rock, calypso, classical (the music of "Minuetto Allegretto" was based on Mozart's Symphony No.41) and surf rock in the style of the Beach Boys.

The songs also developed the Womble characters further, for example "Wellington Goes To Waterloo" described Wellington Womble taking a rare day off and visiting London Waterloo station for a bit of train spotting.

This was the first album with a cover showing the full-size Womble costumes, worn by Batt and the session musicians. The album spent 31 weeks in the UK album chart, peaking at number 18 on 13 July 1974.

Original album track listing
All tracks credited to Mike Batt on the LP label. However, other credits do exist as detailed below (source unknown).

Side One
 Remember You're a Womble (Mike Batt, Chris Spedding) - 3:07
 Minuetto Allegretto (Batt, Spedding) - 3:33
 Non-Stop Wombling Summer Party (Batt, Spedding, Felicity White) - 4:00
 Wombling in the Rain (Batt, Spedding, Paul Peterson) - 3:54
 Womble Burrow Boogie (Batt, Spedding, Ian Hawkins) - 2:58

Side Two
 Wellington Goes to Waterloo (Batt, Spedding, Edward Seymour) - 3:30
 The Return of Cousin Yellowstone (Batt, Spedding, Richard Kelly) - 3:06
 The Womble Square Dance (Batt, Spedding, Hawkins) - 3:12
 Wimbledon Sunset (Interlude) (Batt) - 1:48
 Banana Rock (Batt, Spedding, Seymour) - 3:16

Cassette track listing

Side One
 Remember You're a Womble (3:08)
 Minuetto Allegretto (3:38)
 Non-Stop Wombling Summer Party (4:02)
 Wombling in the Rain (3:58)
 Wimbledon Sunset (1:50)

Side Two
 Wellington Goes to Waterloo (3:36)
 The Return of Cousin Yellowstone (3:12)
 The Womble Square Dance (3:14)
 Banana Rock (3:05)
 Womble Burrow Boogie (2:57)

US track listing
 Wombling Summer Party (3:18)
 Wimbledon Sunset (1:50)
 The Wombling Song (2:26)
 Remember You're a Womble (3:07)
 Exercise is Good for You (2:32)
 Dreaming In the Sun (Orinoco's Song) (4:10)
 Banana Rock (3:05)
 Wellington Womble (3:54)
 Minuetto Allegretto (3:33)
 The Womble Square Dance (3:12)
 The Return of Cousin Yellowstone (3:08)

Singles
Four tracks were released as singles: 
 "Remember You're a Womble"- peaked at No. 3 in UK
 "Banana Rock" - peaked at No. 9 in UK
 "Non-Stop Wombling Summer Party" (US single release only), peaked at No. 55 in US
 "Minuetto Allegretto" - peaked at No. 16 in UK

Spike Milligan recorded a version of the title track as a single in 1976 for Reprise Records as a duet between his Goon Show characters Eccles and Bluebottle.

"Minuetto Allegretto" was used in the 1977 film Wombling Free.

References

The Wombles albums
1974 albums
Albums produced by Mike Batt